Zojz may refer to:

 Zojz (deity), an Albanian sky and lightning god
 Zojz (Kosovo), a settlement in Prizren Municipality, southern Kosovo
 Zojs or Zojz, a settlement in Lezhë County, northwestern Albania